Children of the Future is the debut album by the Steve Miller Band, released in 1968 by Capitol Records. Contributed by several writers, the songs on the album include a mixture of blues and psychedelic rock. The album was produced by British record producer-engineer Glyn Johns. It reached number 134 on the Billboard 200 album chart.

Critical reception 

Rolling Stone described the first side, which plays as a single continuous track (subtitled Children of the Future), as being "constructed like Sgt Pepper". Writing in Crawdaddy!, Peter Knobler called the album "a triple moment of experience, knowledge, inspiration". However, many of the songs had been written earlier when Miller was working as a janitor at a Texas music studio.

Overview 
Children of the Future is the first of two Steve Miller Band albums to feature guitarist/vocalist Boz Scaggs before he embarked on a successful solo career.

Track listing

Personnel 
The Steve Miller Band:
 Steve Miller – guitar, vocals
 Boz Scaggs – guitar, vocals
 Lonnie Turner – bass guitar
 Jim Peterman – Hammond organ
 Tim Davis – drums

References

External links

Steve Miller Band albums
1968 debut albums
Albums produced by Glyn Johns
Capitol Records albums
Albums recorded at Olympic Sound Studios